Pak Khat is a district (amphoe) in the eastern part of Bueng Kan province, northeastern Thailand.

Geography
Neighboring districts are (from the east clockwise) Bueng Kan and So Phisai of Bueng Kan Province, and Rattanawapi of Nong Khai province. To the northwest across the Mekong river is the Laotian province Bolikhamxai.

History
The minor district (king amphoe) was established on 1 October 1978, when it was split off from Phon Phisai district. It was upgraded on 20 March 1986.

Administration
The district is divided into six sub-districts (tambons), which are further subdivided into 64 villages (mubans). The township (thesaban tambon) Pak Khat covers parts of tambons Pak Khat and Non Sila. There are a further six tambon administrative organizations (TAO).

References

External links
amphoe.com

 
Districts of Bueng Kan province